The Cairn Terrier is a terrier breed originating in the Scottish Highlands and recognized as one of Scotland's earliest working dogs. The breed was given the name Cairn because the breed's function was to hunt and chase quarry between the cairns in the Scottish highlands.

Although the breed had existed long before, the name Cairn Terrier was a compromise suggestion after the breed originally was brought to official shows in the United Kingdom in 1909 under the name Short-haired Skye terriers. This name was not acceptable to The Kennel Club due to opposition from Skye Terrier breeders, and the name Cairn Terrier was suggested as an alternative.

History
Cairns originated in the Scottish Highlands and the Isle of Skye, initially grouped in the "Skye Terrier" class alongside the Scottish and West Highland White Terriers. In the early 1900s, the three breeds began to be bred separately.

The Kennel Club of the United Kingdom gave the Cairn Terrier a separate register in 1912; the first year of recognition, 134 were registered, and it was in that year that the breed was given Championship status.

Description

The Cairn Terrier has a harsh weather-resistant outer coat that can be black, cream, wheaten, red, sandy, gray, or brindled in any of these colors. Pure black, black and tan, and white are not permitted by many kennel clubs. While registration of white Cairns was once permitted, after 1917, the American Kennel Club required them to be registered as West Highland White Terriers. A notable characteristic of Cairns is that brindled Cairns frequently change colour throughout their lifetimes. It is not uncommon for a brindled Cairn to become progressively more black or silver as it ages. The Cairn is double-coated, with a soft, dense undercoat and a harsh outer coat. A well-groomed Cairn has a rough-and-ready appearance, free of artifice or exaggeration. The Cairn Terrier was registered into the American Kennel Club in 1903.

Cairn Terriers tend to look similar to a Norwich Terrier, but with some differences (for example the shaggy fur). Their outer layer of fur is shaggy, but they have a soft, downy undercoat. Their ideal weight is also 4.5-7.3 kg (10-16 lb), and the height 9–13 in (23–33 cm).

Grooming

Cairn Terriers shed very little, but always should be hand-stripped. Using scissors or shears can ruin the dog's rugged outer coat after one grooming. Hand-stripping involves pulling the old dead hair out by the roots. If done incorrectly, this can cause discomfort to the dog, causing it to shy away from future hand-stripping. Removing the dead hair in this manner allows new growth to come in. This new growth helps protect the dog from water and dirt.

Cairn Terrier ancestors are from Scotland, where the wire coat repels water and keeps the dog dry even in rainy or damp climates. Keeping the Cairn Terrier coat in its original state will prevent possible skin irritations. As dead hair is removed by stripping the coat, new growth comes in, and the skin and coat remain healthy. Clipper-cutting a Cairn might destroy the protective wire coat unique to this breed.

It is wise to have a pet examined to rule out heritable skin diseases when a Cairn is obtained from unknown sources (i.e. pet stores, rescues, or puppy mills).

Health
These dogs are generally healthy and live on average about 12 to 17 years.

Survey
Breeders, owners, and veterinarians have identified several health problems that are significant for Cairns. Some of these diseases are hereditary, and others occur as a result of nonspecific factors (e.g., infections, toxins, injuries, or advanced age).

Currently, the Cairn Terrier Club of America, along with the Institute for Genetic Disease Control in Animals, maintains an open registry for Cairn Terriers in hopes of reducing the occurrence of hereditary diseases within the breed. Breeders voluntarily submit their dogs' test results for research purposes as well as for use by individuals who seek to make sound breeding decisions.

Some of the more common hereditary health problems found in the Cairn are:
 Bronchoesophageal fistula
 Cataracts
 Corneal dystrophy
 Craniomandibular osteopathy (lion jaw)
 Diabetes mellitus
 Entropion
 Hip dysplasia
 Hypothyroidism
 Krabbe disease (globoid cell leukodystrophy)
 Legg–Calvé–Perthes disease
 Lens luxation
 Luxating patella
 Ocular melanosis
 Portosystemic shunt
 Progressive retinal atrophy
 Soft-tissue sarcoma
 Von Willebrand disease

Living conditions

Cairn Terriers exist happily in an apartment when sufficiently exercised. They are very active indoors and suffice even without a yard. Daily walks help keep Cairn terriers happy and healthy. Fenced-in yards are strongly recommended for safety and well-being as well as being kept on leash when not in the yard.

Cairn Terriers are particularly easily trained; ethical breeders strongly suggest obedience school or some other type of training to direct Cairn Terriers's focus on the owner as the one in command if they are going to be used for hunting. If allowed to take control of the household, behavior problems may develop that only can be resolved by hiring a professional dog trainer. Many breeders only sell puppies to dedicated dog owners who agree to basic obedience school.

Exercise
Cairns are active dogs, thus need a daily walk. Play takes care of a lot of their exercise needs; however, as with all breeds, play will not fulfill their primal instinct to walk. Dogs which do not get to go on daily walks are more likely to display behavior problems. They also enjoy a good romp in a safe, open area off leash, such as a large, fenced yard.

According to Temple Grandin in her book Animals Make Us Human, dogs need 45 minutes to one hour per day of playing and seeking. Being a new owner of one, play time is more like two hours per day for this breed. After fulfilling this, dogs become balanced and well-mannered. Obedience school is often a good start to creating interactive play using words or commands for a dog to perform specific actions on cue. Teaching a Cairn Terrier tricks is also a clever way to direct their active energy into acceptable, controlled dog games.

See also
 Dogs portal
 List of dog breeds

References

External links

FCI breeds
Dog breeds originating in Scotland
Terriers